Damaliscus, commonly known as tsessebes, is a genus of antelope in the family Bovidae, subfamily Alcelaphinae, found in Africa.

Species
Listed alphabetically.

References

 Stuart, Chris & Stuart, Tilde (2007). Field Guide to Mammals of Southern Africa. Fourth edition. Cape Town:Struik Publ.

 
Alcelaphinae
Mammal genera
Taxa named by Oldfield Thomas
Taxa named by Philip Sclater